The Robot series is a series of 37 science fiction short stories and six novels by American writer Isaac Asimov, featuring positronic robots. Later, Asimov would merge the Robot series with his Foundation series.

Robot novels and stories

The series started in 1940, with the story "Robbie" in the September 1940 Super Science Stories (appearing under the title "Strange Playfellow", which was not Asimov's title).  Although it was originally written as a stand-alone story, the following year Asimov published a series of additional robot stories, which fit together into a narrative that was then put together as the book I, Robot.

List of works in the Robot series, in chronological order by narrative 

 I, Robot (1950) and later collections: The Complete Robot (1982), Robot Dreams (1986), Robot Visions (1990), and Gold (1995).
 In 1964, The Rest of the Robots was published - all of the short stories in that collection are found in The Complete Robot, and the novels The Caves of Steel and The Naked Sun were published separately (see below)
 "The Bicentennial Man" (1976) or The Positronic Man (1992) - short story later developed into a complete novel
 "Mother Earth" (1949) - short story, in which no individual robots appear, but positronic robots are part of the background
 The Caves of Steel (1954) - first Robot series/R. Daneel Olivaw novel
 The Naked Sun (1957) - second Robot series/R. Daneel Olivaw novel
 "Mirror Image" (1972) - short story about R. Daneel Olivaw and detective Elijah Baley
 The Robots of Dawn (1983) - third Robot series/R. Daneel Olivaw novel
 Robots and Empire (1985) - fourth Robot series/R. Daneel Olivaw novel

Overview of short stories 
Most of Asimov's robot short stories, which he began to write in 1939, are set in the first age of positronic robotics and space exploration. The unique feature of Asimov's robots is the Three Laws of Robotics, hardwired in a robot's positronic brain, with which all robots in his fiction must comply, and which ensure that the robot does not turn against its creators.

The stories were not initially conceived as a set, but rather all feature his positronic robots—indeed, there are some inconsistencies among them, especially between the short stories and the novels. They all share a theme of the interaction of humans, robots, and morality. Some of the short stories found in The Complete Robot (1982) and other anthologies appear not to be set in the same universe as the Foundation universe. "Victory Unintentional" has positronic robots obeying the Three Laws, but also a non-human civilization on Jupiter. "Let's Get Together" features humanoid robots, but from a different future (where the Cold War is still in progress), and with no mention of the Three Laws. The multiple series offers a sense of completeness, because all of its works are interconnected. Some characters appear in more than one of the stories, and the manufacturer of the robots is often identified as the (fictional) corporation U.S. Robots and Mechanical Men.

The Complete Robot contains most of Asimov's robot short stories. Missing ones were either written after its publication, or formed the text connecting the stories in I, Robot.

The six Asimov robot short stories not included in this book are:
 "Robot Dreams" (found in the anthology of the same title)
 "Robot Visions" (found in the anthology of the same title)
 "Too Bad!" (found in Robot Visions)
 "Christmas Without Rodney" (found in Robot Visions)
 "Cal" (found in Gold)
 "Kid Brother" (found in Gold)

Overview of the Robot novels 
The first book (not a true novel) is I, Robot (1950), a collection of nine previously published short stories woven together as a 21st-century interview with robopsychologist Dr. Susan Calvin. The next four robot novels The Caves of Steel (1953), The Naked Sun (1955), The Robots of Dawn (1983), and Robots and Empire (1985) make up the Elijah Baley (sometimes "Lije Baley") series, and are mysteries starring the Terran Elijah Baley and his humaniform robot partner, R. Daneel Olivaw. They are set thousands of years after the short stories and focus on the conflicts between Spacers — descendants of human settlers from other planets — and the people from an overcrowded Earth. "Mirror Image", one of the short stories from The Complete Robot anthology, is also set in this time period (between The Naked Sun and The Robots of Dawn) and features both Baley and Olivaw. Another short story (found in The Early Asimov anthology), "Mother Earth", is set about a thousand years before the robot novels, when the Spacer worlds chose to become separated from Earth.

The Caves of Steel and The Naked Sun are both considered classics of the genre, but the later novels were also well received, with The Robots of Dawn nominated for both the Hugo and Locus Awards in 1984, and Robots and Empire shortlisted for the Locus Award for Best Science Fiction Novel in 1986.

Inspiration
One source of inspiration for Asimov's robots was the Zoromes, a race of mechanical men that featured in a 1931 short story called "The Jameson Satellite", by Neil R. Jones. Asimov read this story at the age of 11, and acknowledged it as a source of inspiration in Before the Golden Age (1975), an anthology of 1930s science fiction in which Asimov told the story of the science fiction he read during his formative years. In Asimov's own words:

It is from the Zoromes, beginning with their first appearance in "The Jameson Satellite," that I got my own feeling for benevolent robots who could serve man with decency, as these had served Professor Jameson. It was the Zoromes, then, who were the spiritual ancestors of my own "positronic robots," all of them, from Robbie to R. Daneel.

Other authors of robot novels set in Asimov's universe
The 1989 anthology Foundation's Friends included the positronic robot stories "Balance" by Mike Resnick, "Blot" by Hal Clement, "PAPPI" by Sheila Finch, "Plato's Cave" by Poul Anderson, "The Fourth Law of Robotics" by Harry Harrison and "Carhunters of the Concrete Prairie" by Robert Sheckley. Not all of these stories are entirely consistent with the Asimov stories. The anthology also included "Strip-Runner" by Pamela Sargent, set in the era of the Elijah Baley novels.

Shortly before his death in 1992, Asimov approved an outline for three novels (Caliban, Inferno, Utopia) by Roger MacBride Allen, set between Robots and Empire and the Empire series, telling the story of the terraforming of the Spacer world Inferno, and about the robot revolution started by creating a "No Law" Robot, and then New Law Robots.

There is also another set of novels by various authors (Isaac Asimov's Robot City, Robots and Aliens and Robots in Time series), which are not generally considered canon. They are loosely connected to the Robots series, but they contain many inconsistencies with Asimov's books.

The Asimov estate authorized the publication of another trilogy of robot mysteries by Mark W. Tiedemann. These novels, which take place several years before Asimov's Robots and Empire, are Mirage (2000), Chimera (2001), and Aurora (2002). These were followed by yet another robot mystery, Alexander C. Irvine's Have Robot, Will Travel (2004), set five years after the Tiedemann trilogy.

In November 2009, the Asimov estate announced the upcoming publication of Robots and Chaos, the first volume in a trilogy featuring Susan Calvin by fantasy author Mickey Zucker Reichert. The book was published in November 2011 under the title I, Robot: To Protect, and was later followed by two sequels: I, Robot: To Obey (2013) and I, Robot: To Preserve (2016).

Adaptations
 The first screen adaptation of an Asimov robot story was the third episode of the British television series Out of This World based on "Little Lost Robot", first broadcast in 1962.
 This was followed by a 1964 dramatision of The Caves of Steel for the BBC series Story Parade and then four episodes of the BBC television series Out of the Unknown, based on "Satisfaction Guaranteed" (1966), "Reason (in an episode titled "The Prophet", 1967), "Liar!" (1969), and The Naked Sun (1969). In these adaptations, Elijah Baley was portrayed by Peter Cushing (The Caves of Steel) and Paul Maxwell (The Naked Sun), R. Daneel Olivaw by John Carson (The Caves of Steel) and David Collings (The Naked Sun), and Susan Calvin by Beatrix Lehmann ("The Prophet") and Wendy Gifford ("Liar!"). In "Satisfaction Guaranteed", the character of Susan Calvin was renamed Dr. Inge Jensen and portrayed by Ann Firbank.
 El robot embustero (1966), short film directed by Antonio Lara de Gavilán, based on short story "Liar!"
 Robots (1988), film directed by Doug Smith and Kim Takal, based on the Robot series
 Bicentennial Man (1999), film directed by Chris Columbus, based on novelette "The Bicentennial Man" and on novel The Positronic Man
 I, Robot (2004), film directed by Alex Proyas, based on ideas of short stories of the Robot series
 The Apple TV adaptation of the Foundation books contains several references to its shared universe with the Robots series. The robot character of Eto Demerzel is an adaptation of the character R. Daneel whose shrouded long-lived history is frequently mentioned. During the course of the show, several characters reference the "Robot Wars" that happened in the past and are apparently part of the Empire's history. According to showrunner David S. Goyer, the references to aspects such as the "Robot Wars" are planned to be explored in future seasons of the show.

In the late 1970s, Harlan Ellison wrote a screenplay based on Asimov's book I, Robot for Warner Bros. This film project was ultimately abandoned, but Ellison's script was later published in book form as I, Robot: The Illustrated Screenplay (1994).

Merging the Robot series with Asimov's other series

See also
 Isaac Asimov bibliography (categorical)

References

External links
 Detailed timeline for the Robots and Foundation Universe
 Another detailed timeline, sometimes on a day-by-day basis, was published in: 
 Syllabus reading order as suggested by Isaac Asimov—From "Author's Note" of Prelude to Foundation, Doubleday 1988 hardcover edition
 
 

 
 
Artificial intelligence in fiction
Book series introduced in 1950
Robot series
Science fiction book series
Short story series